Bromus grossus, the whiskered brome, is a species of flowering plant in the family Poaceae. It is native to central Europe, and has been introduced to Great Britain, and New York and Oregon in the United States. It has gone extinct in the Netherlands. During the Neolithic it arose as a weed of spelt fields, and due to changing agricultural practices is now considered highly endangered under the Habitats Directive.

References

External links
 Bromus grossus - CABI.org
 Bromus grossus Desf. ex DC. (family POACEAE) - JSTOR Global Plants
 Dicke Trespe - Bromus grossus A. P. de Candolle 1805 - Artensteckbriefe

grossus
Flora of France
Flora of Belgium
Flora of Germany
Flora of Switzerland
Flora of Austria
Flora of Czechoslovakia
Flora of Italy
Plants described in 1805